Wimborne Market was an historic market in a large covered structure in Wimborne Minster, Dorset, England. It ceased to trade on 19 December 2021 after 165 years of trading. The market was demolished and the land redeveloped.

Origins
The market was established in 1855 by Thomas Ensor, who had established a livestock market in Dorchester. Ensor acquired fields next to the new railway station at Wimborne (which opened in 1847) for a livestock market on Tuesdays. The market was suspended during WWII, but livestock trading recommenced in 1955. That trade came to an end in 1972. A produce auction continued until 1975. Meanwhile a stall market was established on Fridays in 1970. From 1972 a bric-a-brac market was started in a building that had previously been used to sell pigs. A car boot market was established in 1982, and a Sunday market in 1984. An antiques market was established in 2013.

Later location
From 1990 the market was located under cover at Riverside Park, Station Road, Wimborne Minster. This was the goods yard to the former railway station, which had closed to traffic in 1977. Trading days were Fridays, Saturdays and Sundays from early morning until 2 pm. Market traders sold fresh food, vintage and antique items, and household essentials. 

There were subsidiary markets at Dorchester and Swanage and a car boot sale at Lake Gates. A farmers' market was held on the 3rd Saturday of each month.

Proposed relocation
In 2020, it was announced that, due to high business rates and changing shopping patterns, the market would move from its then current location later that year to Lake Gates. Lake Gates is the site of a Roman fortress, and is the location of weekly car boot sales, also run by the George family, who acquired the market from the Ensors in the 1970s. Lake Gates is also known as The Wimborne Showground, and is located just of the A31 just outside the market town of Wimborne. 

In 2021, the owners of the existing market site announced that it had been sold for retirement housing to McCarthy & Stone. Wimborne Town Council are considering (2020) establishing a weekly street market in Wimborne once the market relocates to Lake Gates. As at February 2022, the market has not yet relocated to Lake Gates.

References

External links
 Wimborne Market
The Wimborne Showground Ltd

Wimborne Minster
1855 establishments in England
Retail markets in England
Tourist attractions in Dorset
Market halls
2021 disestablishments in England